The South Pacific Touring Car Championship was a motorsport championship staged in Australia and New Zealand for Group A touring cars between October and December in 1986. The championship was won by Australian driver Allan Grice.

The series received little support from the top teams, especially the Australians other than for the first two rounds held in Australia, while all bar a couple of the New Zealand teams only contested NZ races. Once the series went to New Zealand, Grice and Charlie O'Brien were in fact the only Australian drivers to support the series while those such as Peter Jackson Nissan, JPS Team BMW and the Mobil Holden Dealer Team completely ignored the NZ races.

The series was reportedly set to continue in 1987, however after the first race in Adelaide, interest flagged as the Australian teams were not interested in going to New Zealand after a long season which included the 1987 World Touring Car Championship rounds at Bathurst, Calder and Wellington and the series was cancelled.

Champions

1986 race calendar
The 1986 South Pacific Touring Car Championship was contested over a five-round series with two races in Australia and three races in New Zealand.

Round 1 of the series also doubled as Round 5 of the 1986 Australian Endurance Championship, while Round 2 in Adelaide also doubled as the Group A support race at the  Australian Formula One Grand Prix.

Championship results

See also
Touring car racing
Group A
Australian Endurance Championship

References

Touring car racing series
Defunct auto racing series